"Look at Me" is the debut solo single of British singer Geri Halliwell, who recorded and released it after leaving Spice Girls. Written and composed in collaboration by Halliwell, Paul Wilson, and Andy Watkins, it was released on 10 May 1999 as the lead single from Halliwell's debut solo album, Schizophonic. It peaked at number one in New Zealand, number two in the United Kingdom, and number three in Australia and Ireland. To promote the single, Halliwell performed the song on Top of the Pops, Party in the Park, Wetten Dass, Tickled Pink, Tapis Rouge, Musica Si, Festival Bar 1999, The Rosie O'Donnell Show, Graine de Star and The Tonight Show with Jay Leno.

Lyrical content
The lyrics of "Look at Me" consist largely, specifically in the verses, of rhymed couplets of phrases that evoke contrasts. But two lines are repeated in both verses; these are the warning "What you see ain't what you are gettin'" and a reference to "superficial expectations". NME felt that the track was attempting to "create a self-reflexive conundrum, the knowingly blank canvas, the irony-chip Idoru". Halliwell admitted that she intended to convey that "we shouldn’t take each other on just face value. We can be anything. We can be all of these people."

Critical reception
Reception for "Look at Me" was mostly positive. Website AllMusic deemed it "upbeat", "self-conscious", and "silly". BBC News described it as "undeniably catchy", comparing Halliwell's performance to Shirley Bassey as "the queen of the scene flanked by a posse of subservient men", and added that it "has shades of "The Lady Is a Vamp", from the album Spiceworld. Larry Flick from Billboard called it a "eccentric, over-the-top track", and noted further that the song is "tinged with everything from James Bond thematics and vaudeville to Britpop and Nancy Sinatra's "These Boots Are Made For Walking"". Birmingham Evening Mail commented, "Ginger puts the Spices well and truly behind her with a song that will probably appeal to adults as well as, if not more than, the teenie market. It's a more mature, fifties-style belter in which Geri reveals different facets of her character." Can't Stop the Pop stated that the song "is a little bit pop, a little bit jazz and a whole lot theatrical. Musically, it’s vaguely reminiscent of "The Lady Is a Vamp" from Spiceworld, albeit less pastiche and more pointed." They added that "there’s no doubt that Geri had a lot to say as an artist, and much of it came out in the music video for Look at Me." Lou Carlozo from the Chicago Tribune felt that "Spice Girls fans should like the single", because the song had a "bouncy pop feel, but a more polished sound than the typical Spice Girls song". The Daily Vault's Christopher Thelen said the track "doesn't quite seem like Halliwell knows which way she wants to take her new career. And, in a sense, that's understandable - but the sudden shift in style midway through the track and the subsequent return to the first one is a bit confusing."

"Look at Me" was selected as the one of the few post-Spice Girls song to be featured in the jukebox musical Viva Forever! in its entirety; producer Judy Craymer said of it, "It's a very diva-like song and perfect for the hard world of television and its judges who we portray as the gods on Mount Olympus".

Chart performance
"Look at Me" was released in the United Kingdom on 10 May 1999. Since Halliwell had chosen "Look at Me" as the first single from Schizophonic and because she felt as though the song was going to return her to the mainstream market, it was released the same week as Boyzone's "You Needed Me." In early 1999, Boyzone was at the height of its own success with five UK number-ones, however, Halliwell was confident that "Look at Me" would reach number-one. Though more transactions were made of the "Look at Me" single, two CD singles of "You Needed Me" were released in order for fans to purchase both and ensure that Boyzone made it to the number-one position.

"Look at Me" entered the UK Singles Chart at number two, selling 140,000 copies in its first week; it was only 700 copies behind Boyzone's "You Needed Me." Halliwell was disappointed with the outcome of the chart performance for "Look at Me," since she had believed that it would reach number one. She had also feared that her career would be ruined six months after the release of the single. However, Halliwell would earn her first UK number-one single with "Mi Chico Latino." "Look at Me" went on to sell 330,812 copies in the United Kingdom alone, being certified Gold by the BPI, and over 1.5 million copies worldwide.

Music video
The accompanying music video for "Look at Me" was directed by Vaughan Arnell and filmed in Prague, Czech Republic from 18–20 March 1999. The music video features four versions of Halliwell: a vamp, a bitch, a virgin, and a sister. Most of the music video is black and white, except in one scene in the middle of the video, during the funeral of Halliwell's stage persona "Ginger Spice", Halliwell was seen (as the British Union Jack was pulled off "Ginger's" coffin) with red hair, blonde highlights, and a red thorn crown—and laughing with eyes wide open. The ruby slippers worn by Ginger were referencing The Red Shoes. In the last part, Halliwell and male dancers are dancing on a large staircase and then in front of a fountain. At the end of the video is a message saying "Geri's back!" with a picture of a nude Geri skinny dipping and ends with a double-story lower case g decorated with a halo and an arrowhead tail.

Track listings

UK, Canadian, and Australian CD single
 "Look at Me"
 "Look at Me" (Mark!s Big Vocal Mix Surgery edit)
 "Look at Me" (Terminalhead remix)
 "Look at Me" (video)
 An alternate version containing four postcards was also released in the UK.

UK and US cassette single
 "Look at Me"
 "Look at Me" (Mark!s Big Vocal Mix Surgery edit)
 "Look at Me" (Terminalhead remix)

European CD single
 "Look at Me"
 "Look at Me" (Terminalhead remix)
 "Look at Me" (video)

Italian 12-inch single
A1. "Look at Me" (Mark!s Big Vocal Mix Surgery edit)
A2. "Look at Me" (Mark!s Fantasy dub)
B1. "Look at Me" (Sharp Boys vocal remix)
B2. "Look at Me" (full length version)

Japanese CD single
 "Look at Me" (full length version)
 "Look at Me" (Mark!s Big Vocal Mix Surgery edit)
 "Look at Me" (Terminalhead remix)
 "Look at Me" (Sharp Boys vocal remix)
 "Look at Me" (Sharp Boys Queeny dub)

Charts

Weekly charts

Year-end charts

Certifications

Release history

References

1999 debut singles
1999 songs
Black-and-white music videos
EMI Records singles
Geri Halliwell songs
Music videos directed by Vaughan Arnell
Number-one singles in New Zealand
Song recordings produced by Absolute (production team)
Songs written by Andy Watkins
Songs written by Geri Halliwell
Songs written by Paul Wilson (songwriter)